Wilczęta  is a village in Braniewo County, Warmian-Masurian Voivodeship, in northern Poland. It is the seat of the gmina (administrative district) called Gmina Wilczęta.

The village has a population of 430.

Sports
The local football club is Piast Wilczęta. It competes in the lower leagues.

References

Villages in Braniewo County